Kenneth Milton Stampp (12 July 191210 July 2009), Alexander F. and May T. Morrison Professor of History Emeritus at the University of California, Berkeley (1946–1983), was a celebrated historian of slavery, the American Civil War, and Reconstruction. He was a visiting professor at Harvard University and Colgate University, Commonwealth Lecturer at the University of London, Fulbright Lecturer at the University of Munich, and held the Harmsworth Chair at Oxford University. In 1989, he received the American Historical Association Award for Scholarly Distinction. In 1993, he won the prestigious Lincoln Prize for lifetime achievement by the Civil War Institute at Gettysburg College.

Life and career
Stampp was born in Milwaukee, Wisconsin, in 1912; his parents were of German Protestant descent.  His mother was a Baptist who forbade alcohol and strictly observed the Sabbath; his father, a tough disciplinarian in the old-world German style.

His family suffered through the Great Depression, "there was never enough money," but Stampp worked a number of small odd jobs as a teen, managing to save enough to afford tuition, first, at Milwaukee State Teachers' College, and then at the University of Wisconsin, Madison. He earned both his B.A. and M.A. there in 1935 and 1936 respectively under the influences of Charles A. Beard (author of An Economic Interpretation of the Constitution of the United States) and William B. Hesseltine (known for coining the phrase about intellectual history: it's "like nailing jelly to the wall").  Hesseltine supervised Stampp's dissertation; Stampp remembered him as a "bastard" during this time, but the two managed to work together successfully through the completion of Stampp's Ph.D. in 1942. He then spent brief stints at the University of Arkansas and the University of Maryland, College Park, 1942–46, before joining the faculty at Berkeley.  His teaching tenure ran 37 years; in 2006, Stampp celebrated six decades of association there.

During his undergraduate years at Wisconsin, Stampp was a member of the Theta Xi fraternity.

He died two days before his 97th birthday on July 10, 2009, in Oakland, California.

The Peculiar Institution
In his first major book, The Peculiar Institution: Slavery in the Ante-Bellum South (1956), Stampp countered the arguments of historians such as Ulrich Phillips, who characterized slavery as an essentially benign and paternalistic institution that promoted Southern racial harmony. Stampp asserted, to the contrary, that African Americans actively resisted slavery, not just through armed uprisings but also through work slowdowns, the breaking of tools, theft from masters, and diverse other means.  Through a lengthy scholarly career, Stampp insisted that the moral debate over slavery lay at the crux of the Civil War, rather than other reasons related to the economic or political relationship between the Federal Government and the states. Later work by other historians qualified certain of the book's claims, but The Peculiar Institution remains a central text in the study of U.S. slavery.

Criticism of the Dunning School
His next study, The Era of Reconstruction, also revised a scholarly stronghold, that of the story put forth by William A. Dunning (1857–1922) and his school of followers. In this rendering, the South emerges mercilessly beaten, "prostrate in defeat, before a ruthless, vindictive conqueror, who plundered its land and...turned its society upside down...." The North's greatest sin, according to Dunning, consisted of relinquishing control of the Southern governments to "ignorant, half-civilized former slaves."

To systematically refute Dunning's interpretation, Stampp amassed a trove of secondary sources.  He was criticized for not employing more primary material.  Stampp's rejoinder was seen by some historians as a pro-Northern rationalization: though he clearly admitted that the North walked out on Reconstruction while it was nowhere near completion, he went on to claim that in light of the passage of the 14th and 15th amendments, Reconstruction was a success; he deemed it "the last great crusade of nineteenth-century romantic reformers." But for an equal number of other historians, Stampp's appraisal rang as eminently "temperate, judicious and fair-minded."

Major monographs

Indiana Politics During the Civil War (1949) [revised dissertation]
And the War Came: The North and the Secession Crisis, 1860-1861 (1950)
The Peculiar Institution: Slavery in the Ante-Bellum South, Knopf (1956); Vintage (1989) 
The Causes of the Civil War (1959) editor
Andrew Johnson and the Failure of the Agrarian Dream (1962)
The Era of Reconstruction, 1865-1877, Knopf (1965); Vintage (1967) 
The Southern Road to Appomattox (1969)
Reconstruction: An Anthology of Revisionist Writings (1969) co-editor
The Imperiled Union: Essays on the Background of the Civil War (1980)
America in 1857: A Nation on the Brink (1990)
The United States and National Self-Determination: Two Traditions (1991)

Notes

References
Much of the information for this article is drawn from three principal sources:
John G. Sproat, "Kenneth M. Stampp," in Dictionary of Literary Biography vol. 17: Twentieth-Century American Historians, ed. Clyde N. Wilson. (Detroit, Mich.: Gale Research Co., 1983), 401–407;
"Kenneth M. Stampp, Historian of Slavery, the Civil War, and Reconstruction, University of California, Berkeley, 1946-1983", an oral history conducted in 1996 by Ann Lage, Regional Oral History Office, The Bancroft Library, University of California, Berkeley, 1998.  Available from the Online Archive of California
Theodore Binnema, "Kenneth M. Stampp," Encyclopedia of Historians and Historical Writing, vol. 2, ed. Kelly Boyd. (London, Chicago: Fitzroy Dearborn Publishers, 1997), 1144–1145.

1912 births
2009 deaths
Harvard University faculty
Historians of the American Civil War
Historians of the Southern United States
Historians of the Reconstruction Era
Historians of race relations
Writers from Milwaukee
University of Arkansas faculty
University of California, Berkeley faculty
University of Maryland, College Park faculty
University of Wisconsin–Madison alumni
Lincoln Prize winners
20th-century American historians
American male non-fiction writers
Harold Vyvyan Harmsworth Professors of American History
Historians from California
Historians from Wisconsin
20th-century American male writers